At least two ships of the Brazilian Navy have borne the name Araguari

 , an  launched in 1946 and stricken in 1974
 , an  launched in 2010 as San Fernando for the Trinidad and Tobago Coastguard she was acquired by Brazil in 2012

Brazilian Navy ship names